Vivien Saad (born 23 June 1992) is an Australian rules footballer playing for the Gold Coast in the AFL Women's (AFLW). She previously played for North Melbourne.

AFLW career
Saad was recruited by North Melbourne in January 2020 as a replacement for Jess Duffin who missed the 2020 season through pregnancy. She made her debut against  at Casey Fields in the opening round of the 2020 season.

Saad was traded to the Gold Coast alongside pick 30 in exchange for pick 19 in the late stages of the 2021 trade period, on 9 June 2021.

References

External links

1992 births
Living people
Australian people of Lebanese descent
North Melbourne Football Club (AFLW) players
Melbourne University Football Club (VFLW) players
Australian rules footballers from Victoria (Australia)
Gold Coast Football Club (AFLW) players